Elizabeth Tan (born 6 January 1990, in London) is an English actress. She is known for her roles as Vera Chiang in The Singapore Grip, Li in Emily in Paris and Maude in the gang drama, Top Boy.

Career
Tan played Princess Windsor in the BBC One school-based drama series, Waterloo Road. In the series, Princess' storylines involve a rocky relationship with George (Angus Deayton) and a short-lived affair with Kevin Chalk (Tommy Lawrence Knight).

Tan appeared as Sulim, a transgender woman, in The Syndicate (with Mark Addy), a BBC drama series depicting a syndicate of workers at a public hospital in Bradford who enter a lottery and win. In the same year, Tan appeared in the BBC series Way to Go as Ryh-Ming, a television sitcom starring Blake Harrison and created by Bob Kushell.

Tan's earlier roles include Anna Zhou in Journey's End, the second episode of the two-part finale of series 4 of the British science fiction series Doctor Who, Penny Anderson in New Tricks, Lu Choi in Hustle and the enigmatic Madame Ching in the fantasy drama Spirit Warriors. Other BBC television appearances include Spooks/MI5, Hotel Babylon and the comedy series, Just for Laughs.

Tan's first Bollywood role was as Pae in the Amtiaz Ali romantic comedy Love Aaj Kal, starring Saif Ali Khan and Deepika Padukone. She also had a role in the movie, Swinging with the Finkels, starring Martin Freeman, Mandy Moore and Melissa George.

Tan's other regular roles in 2019 included Maude, the lesbian girlfriend of Jaq, played by Jasmine Jobson, in the Netflix gang drama Top Boy.

In 2020, Tan appeared in the role of Vera Chiang in the ITV World War II drama, The Singapore Grip, based on the novel of the same title by J. G. Farrell and adapted by Christopher Hampton.
She can also be seen in the role of Li in Netflix's drama series Emily in Paris, from the Sex and the City creator, Darren Star, which was released in 2020.
She portrays Jun in the Agatha Christie murder mystery, Agatha and the Midnight Murders.

Tan's first major role was portraying the character of Xin Proctor, a student who was best friends with Tina McIntyre, in the long-running  ITV soap opera, Coronation Street, the show's first regular Chinese character.

Film and television

Theatre

Tan's notable theatre roles include, Stephanie, in J.C.Lee's "Luce" at the Southwark Playhouse where she portrayed an American college student dealing with abuse for which she received favourable reviews. She also played a wild teenager, Keiko, in Francis Turnly's "[Harakjuku Girls]" at the Finborough Theatre. 
Other theatre appearances include her roles as Abigail in Arthur Miller's The Crucible and her portrayal of Bunny, a Korean teenager, in the play, This Isn’t Romance at the Soho Theatre.

References

External links

 
 

1990 births
Living people
Actresses from London
British actresses of Chinese descent
English people of Chinese descent
English film actresses
English television actresses